VfL Wolfsburg suffered a nightmare season, only just staying up in Bundesliga, in spite of signing internationally seasoned players Diego and Simon Kjær. Being threatened at the bottom of the table, especially after selling key striker Edin Džeko to Manchester City. The replacements were not up to scratch, which saw manager Steve McClaren sacked. Following a short stint with Pierre Littbarski in charge, the club's 2009 championship-winning manager Felix Magath, who just had been sacked from Schalke 04, in spite of having taken them to the quarter-finals of the UEFA Champions League. Magath dropped Diego, prompting the Brazilian to refuse to sit on the substitutes' bench. In spite of the turmoil, a crucial away win at Werder Bremen helped Wolfsburg to stay just two points above Borussia Mönchengladbach in the relegation-playoff zone.

Squad

Defenders
  Andrea Barzagli
  Michael Schulze
  Robin Knoche
  Marcel Schäfer
  Arne Friedrich
  Peter Pekarík
  Alexander Madlung
  Fabian Johnson
  Simon Kjær

Midfielders
  Sascha Riether
  Christian Gentner
  Akaki Gogia
  Thomas Kahlenberg
  Makoto Hasebe
  Josué
  Ashkan Dejagah
  Karim Ziani
  Diego
  Jan Polák
  Yohandry Orozco
  Koo Ja-cheol

Attackers
  Grafite
  Edin Džeko
  Caiuby
  Tuncay
  Patrick Helmes
  Mario Mandžukić
  Dieumerci Mbokani

Bundesliga

League table

Matches

Top scorers
  Edin Džeko (10)
  Mario Mandžukić (8)
  Grafite (9)
  Diego (6)

Sources
  Soccerway - Germany - VfL Wolfsburg

VfL Wolfsburg seasons
Wolfsburg